{{Automatic taxobox
| image = Histioteuthis hoylei.jpg
| image_caption = Stigmatoteuthis hoylei
| taxon = Stigmatoteuthis
| authority = Pfeffer, 1900<ref name = WoRMS>{{cite web | url = http://www.marinespecies.org/aphia.php?p=taxdetails&id=410400 | title = Stigmatoteuthis Pfeffer, 1900 | accessdate = 6 March 2018 | publisher = Flanders Marine Institute | author = Julian Finn | year = 2016 | work = World Register of Marine Species}}</ref>
| type_species = Histiopsis hoylei| type_species_authority = Goodrich, 1896
}}Stigmatoteuthis is a genus of squid from the family Histioteuthidae. They occur in the Oceans from the tropics south to the temperate seas.

Species
There are three species in the genus Stigmatoteuthis:Stigmatoteuthis arcturi Robson, 1948Stigmatoteuthis dofleini Pfeffer, 1912Stigmatoteuthis hoylei'' (Goodrich, 1896)

References

Squid
Cephalopod genera
Taxa named by Georg Johann Pfeffer